Raphidiidae is a family of snakeflies in the order Raphidioptera.

Genera

Raphidiidae are divided in 28 genera with about 210 species
Africoraphidia 
Agulla Navas 1914
Alena Navas 1916
Atlantoraphidia
Calabroraphidia
Dichrostigma
Harraphidia
Hispanoraphidia
Iranoraphidia
Italoraphidia
Mauroraphidia
Mongoloraphidia
Ohmella H. Aspöck & U. Aspöck
Ornatoraphidia
Parvoraphidia
Phaeostigma
Puncha
Raphidia Linnaeus, 1758
Raphidilla
Subilla
Tadshikoraphidia
Tauroraphidia
Tjederiraphidia
Turcoraphidia 
Ulrike
Venustoraphidia
Xanthostigma
†Succinoraphidiinae Aspöck & Aspöck, 2004
†Succinoraphidia Aspöck & Aspöck, 2004
†Archiinocellia  (Ypresian; British Columbia, Colorado)

References

Biolib
EoL
E. Haring Molecular phylogeny of the Raphidiidae (Raphidioptera)

Raphidioptera
Insect families